Echinacanthus is a genus of flowering plants belonging to the family Acanthaceae.

Its native range is Himalaya to Southern China.

Species:

Echinacanthus attenuatus 
Echinacanthus lofuensis 
Echinacanthus longipes 
Echinacanthus longzhouensis

References

Acanthaceae
Acanthaceae genera